Encyclopaedia of the Laws of England is an encyclopedia of English law edited by Alexander Wood Renton and (captain) Maxwell Alexander Robertson (sometimes called "Max Robertson"). The first edition was published as Encyclopaedia of the Laws of England, Being a New Abridgment, in thirteen volumes (including a supplement edited by A W Donald), from 1897 to 1903. The second edition was published as Encyclopaedia of the Laws of England, with Forms and Precedents, in seventeen volumes (including two supplementary volumes), from 1906 to 1919. Volumes one to five of the third edition, revised, edited by Ernest Arthur Jelf, were published from 1938 to 1940.

The encyclopedia has a foreword by Frederick Pollock.

Other contributors included Challis, Holland, Ilbert, Maitland, Blake Odgers, Phillimore, and "many other recognized authorities on the subjects with which they deal". "A high standard of execution is maintained throughout". Holland's account of the Civil Law has been called "admirable" and Ilbert's article on Codification has been called "brightly written" and said to do "full justice to Bentham's work as a law reformer". Jelf said the paper on "Customs", contributed to volume 4 by C J Follett was "excellent".

First Edition
In 1898, the Law Quarterly Review said of volume 4 of the First Edition:

Second Edition
In 1906, the Law Quarterly Review said of volume 1 of the Second Edition:

References

Julius J Marke (ed), A Catalogue of the Law Collection at New York University with Selected Annotations, Law Center of New York University, 1953, Library of Congress Catalog card 58-6489, Reprinted by The Lawbook Exchange Ltd (Union, New Jersey) 1999, p 33
Percy Henry Winfield. The Chief Sources of English Legal History. Harvard University Press. 1925. Reprinted by Beard Books. 2000. Pages 65, 194 and 248.
Jelf, Where to Find Your Law, 1907, pp xl, 88 & 469 Google Books
George Matthew Dutcher. A Guide to Historical Literature. P Smith. 1949. Page 538. Google Books
Mudge, Reed & Winchell. Guide to Reference Books. Fifth Edition. American Library Association. 1929. p 106. Google Books
Isadore Gilbert Mudge. Guide to the Study and Use of Reference Books. American Library Association. 1917. Volume 3. Part 4. Number 340 at page 75 Google Books
George Watson (ed). The Cambridge Bibliography of English Literature. Cambridge University Press. 1966. Volume 5. Page 345
"XIII Legal Literature" in The Cambridge History of English and American Literature. 1907-1921. Volume 8 (The Age of Dryden). Bartleby
(1898) 14 Law Quarterly Review 213, 324 and 424
(1907) 23 Law Quarterly Review 124 and 246; 24 Law Quarterly Review 105 and 229; 25 Law Quarterly Review 110. See also index p 432.
"Reviews and Notices" (1909) 25 Law Quarterly Review 427 (October) Google Books
(1899) 24 Law Magazine and Review (Fifth Series) 244 Google Books
(1915) 40 Law Magazine and Review (Fifth Series) 126 Google Books [review of 2nd Ed, vol 16]
"Law Library" (1908) 124 The Law Times 179 Google Books
(1915) 139-140 The Law Times 296 Google Books [review of Jacob's Supplement to 2nd Ed]
"Encyclopaedia of Law" in "Law Library" (1939) 187 The Law Times 13 (7 January) Google Books [review of 3rd Ed, vol 3; there is also a review of vol 4 in this volume]
"Encyclopaedia of English Law" in "Reviews" (1906) 41 The Law Journal 583 (1 September) Google Books
"Reviews" (1907) 42 The Law Journal 5 and 375 (5 January and 8 June) Google Books
"The Encyclopaedia" in "Reviews" (1919) 54 The Law Journal 445 (29 November) Google Books [review of 2nd Ed, vol 17]
"Reviews: Books of the Week" (1913) 57 Solicitors' Journal & Weekly Reporter 516 Google Books
(1914) 58 Solicitors Journal and Weekly Reporter 752 (8 August) Google Books [review of 2nd Ed, vol 16]
"Review" (1939) 103 Justice of the Peace and Local Government Review 411 (17 June) Google Books [review of 3rd Ed, vol 4]
"Reviews of Books" (1897) 9 Juridical Review 224 and 445 Google Books
"Reviews of Books" (1898) 10 The Juridical Review 100 and 365 Google Books
"Reviews of Books" (1907) 18 The Juridical Review 431 Google Books
21 Juridical Review 270 (Edinburgh)
(1919) 38 Law Notes 262 Google Books
"Reviews" (1914) 36 Law Students' Journal 168 (1 August) Google Books
(1897) 13 Scottish Law Review and Sheriff Court Reports 74 Google Books
(1898) 32 Irish Law Times and Solicitors' Journal 316, see also pp 276 & 309 Google Books
"Topical Index to Recent Legal Literature" (1910) 8 Michigan Law Review 260 at 262 JSTOR
"Another Legal Rechauffee" (1897) 84 The Saturday Review 44 (10 July)  
(1905) 2 Book Auction Records 54 Google Books

Law books
English law
Encyclopedias of law
British encyclopedias
1897 non-fiction books
1906 non-fiction books
1938 non-fiction books
19th-century encyclopedias
20th-century encyclopedias